Tiong Bahru Secondary School (TBSS, 立道中学), established in 1966 and merged with Delta Secondary School in 1991, was one of the first bilingual integrated (混合中学) secondary schools built after Singapore Independence (August 9, 1965). It had both Chinese and English streams, attracting students from nearby primary schools in Tiong Bahru, Bukit Ho Swee and Delta Road areas.

History
The school was established in 1966, during a period when then Singapore Minister for Education Ong Pang Boon was establishing bilingualism (中/英双语) in schools. The opening ceremony was held on June 3, 1967.

The first principal was Ngui Jim Chiang  (1966-1970), a former World War II lieutenant, who was succeeded by a former Raffles Institution head of department in chemistry, Chung Chee Sang (1971 - 1978). 

On June 6, 1976, then Prime Minister Lee Kuan Yew planted an Angsana tree at the school during a visit as part of the "Use Your Hands" campaign.

As the population in the Tiong Bahru / Bukit Ho Swee neighbourhood was ageing, and the younger generation families moving out, the school's student enrollment dropped after the late 1980s. The school closed in 1991, merging with its neighbour, Bukit Ho Swee Secondary School (立达中学) to form Delta Secondary School, and subsequently in 2004 all were grouped under Bukit Merah Secondary School.

The vacated campus was once used as the temporary administrative head office of Nanyang Polytechnic, and is now the Singapore Examinations and Assessment Board's Tiong Bahru Examinations Centre.

Academics
The 1971 graduated batch produced top GCE O-level students in Singapore, five of whom went on to the country's then only junior college, National Junior College (国家初级学院), and thereafter one student won the prestigious Public Service Commission Overseas Merit Scholarship (to France).

Athletics and extracurricular activities

The school had outstanding sports in mountain climbing (it was the first Singapore school to climb Mount Kinabalu) and basketball teams. 

The school's first brass band was formed in 1969, and within three years it placed in the Top 20 (11th place) in the Singapore Youth Festival Brass Band Competition.

Notable alumni
 Olivia Lum: Founder and CEO, Hyflux

References

External links
 A TBSS student report book used in 1968-1971
 Electronic Copy of ALL annual magazines

Secondary schools in Singapore